Perenco is an independent Anglo-French oil and gas company with a headquarters in London and Paris. It conducts exploration and production activities in 16 countries around the globe (the North Sea, Cameroon, Gabon, Republic of Congo, Democratic Republic of Congo, Guatemala, Ecuador, Colombia, Peru, Venezuela, Brazil, Belize, Tunisia, Egypt, Turkey, Iraq, Vietnam, Trinidad and Tobago).

History
The company was established in 1975 by Hubert Perrodo as a marine services company based in Singapore. In 1980 the Group founded the Techfor drilling company and built a fleet of drilling rigs, jack-ups, swamp barges and land rigs. In 1982, the Group acquired the French drilling company Cosifor. In 1985, Perenco began its expansion into the upstream business, acquiring several proven onshore oil and gas fields in the United States, applying secondary-recovery techniques to enhance production. In 1992, it changed its profile to the oil exploration and production.

Operations
Perenco operates in 16 countries and has over 6,000 employees. While Perenco's growth has been driven by acquisitions, the Group's strategy evolved rapidly towards increasing production and reserves, renewing licenses and securing additional acreage for new exploration and development opportunities.

Australia 
Perenco holds a 60% interest in, and operates, exploration permit T/32P and holds a 37,5% interest in T/35P operated by Santos in partnership with Mitsui. These permits are located in the offshore Sorell Basin in South-East Australia, which is an extension of the producing Otway Basin. They offer a range of play types, prospects and leads, some of which are analogous to the Thylacine and Geographe fields in the Otway basin.

Perenco also holds a 33% interest in AC/P45 and 40% in AC/P44 in the Browse Basin of the NW shelf with the remainder held by Finder Exploration, who retain operatorship.

Belize
Perenco holds a 100% interest in Block A, located in the north of Belize. The Block A exploration permit was signed with the Belizean Authorities in January 2008. The permit is located in the Corozal Basin, an extension of the producing North Peten Basin in Guatemala, and to the north of the Spanish Lookout and Never Delay fields.

Brazil 
Perenco was awarded five deep water exploration licenses in the Brazilian 9th round of licensing, with concession agreements signed in March 2008. The exploration blocks are all operated by Perenco and are held in partnership with OGX. The blocks are contiguous and located in the offshore Espirito Santo basin.

Colombia 
Perenco operates six association contracts and one concession contract under its subsidiary Perenco Colombia Ltd, founded in 1993 and based in Bogota.

Congo 
Perenco operates four offshore fields in the Republic of Congo:
Emeraude Field since 2001
Yombo Field since 2002
Likouala Field since 2010
PNGF-Sud Fields since 2017

Cameroon 
Perenco has operated in Cameroon since 1993, as a partner with ExxonMobil and SNH, Cameroon's state-owned hydrocarbon company. In 2018, Perenco began production at Camaroon LNG on the floating LNG unit Hilli Episeyo.

Democratic Republic of Congo (DRC) 
Since Perenco's arrival in the region in 2000, production has increased significantly through continual investment in new production wells (about 30 per year), and through the company's technical expertise (such as modifications to the pumping systems) focused on completing the primary recovery process and starting the secondary and tertiary recovery processes.

Perenco is the DRC's sole oil producer and is the largest investor and taxpayer in the country.

Ecuador 
In July 2009, the Government of Ecuador took over a day-to-day operations Perenco's fields in Ecuador. Perenco has announced it would file a claim with the International Centre for Settlement of Investment Disputes.

Gabon 
Perenco began operations in Gabon in 1992 with the acquisition of four offshore fields south of Port-Gentil. The production is  through 29 offshore and onshore licences.

Since December 18, 2007, Perenco has supplied gas to the power plants of Libreville and Port-Gentil. This successful partnership is the result of a project enabling Perenco to provide up to 680,000m3 of gas per day (450,000m3 to Libreville-Owendo and 230,000m3 to Port-Gentil).

In 2017, Perenco made a deal with Total Gabon, in order to take operatorship of several licences that were previously produced by Total only.

In 2018, Perenco entered talks to purchase Sardine from Forafric Energy.

Guatemala 
Perenco has operated in Guatemala since 2001, when it acquired Basic Resources International Ltd. of the Bahamas from Anadarko Petroleum. Anadarko had acquired Basic, which operated oilfields that produced about 20,000 bbl/d in the Rubelsanto and the Xan regions in northern Guatemala, when it purchased Union Pacific Resources Co. in 2000 (Perenco Group, 2001). Its principal assets in the country comprise Xan Field, La Libertad refinery, and  pipeline with six pumping stations connecting Xan and Rubelsanto fields to the Piedras Negras Terminal on Guatemala's Atlantic coast.

Iraq 
Perenco no longer exists in Iraq. Its subsidiary office in Erbil was closed in mid 2013 and there is no longer exploration and/or activities are ongoing in Northern Iraq Kurdistan. Perenco owned Sindi-Amedi Exploration License from 2007 to 2013 which is located in the Kurdistan Autonomous Region of Northern Iraq. The license area is 2,358 km2 and is located adjacent to the Silopi licenses in Turkey in which Perenco is a partner. The license is also adjacent to the Tawke field. Perenco has closed the subsidiary office in Iraq at mid 2013.

Mexico 
In August 2018, Perenco reached an agreement to acquire 49% of Petrofac Limited in Mexico.

Peru 
Perenco holds a 100% interest in the licence contract for Block 67 in the Maranon Basin. Block 67 comprises Paiche, Dorado and Pirana fields. The development plan includes the drilling of over 170 wells from 10 platforms and construction of central processing facilities and local pipelines for delivery of crude oil into the export pipeline system. This system will transport production to Bayovar export terminal, located 1000 km from Block 67 on the Pacific coast. In April 2009, the development of Block 67 was declared as a project of national necessity and interest. Around the same time, Perenco’s presence in the region was opposed by indigenous organisations in Peru which filed lawsuits against the company.

In 2013, a helicopter carrying Perenco workers crashed in Peru.

Tunisia
Perenco's Tunisian assets were acquired in July 2002. Perenco now owns 50% and operates the on-stream El Franig, Baguel, and Tarfa gas condensate fields in central Tunisia.

Production from the El Franig and Baguel fields is transported to the central processing facility in Oum-Chiah via 120 km of pipeline. Condensate is transferred to the La Skhira terminal for export, and gas is delivered to the Gabes plant for domestic consumption.

Perenco is actively exploring the Takrouna permit, and a 400 km 2D seismic programme has already been acquired. Evaluation of relevant data will determine a location for an exploration well.

Trinidad and Tobago
In December 2016, Perenco acquired the Teak, Samaan and Poui (TSP) fields offshore the south-east coast of Trinidad from Repsol. Perenco is the operator and holds 70% interest in the assets with state owned Heritage and NGC holding the remaining 30%. TSP produces more than 10,000 bopd from Plio-Pleistocene sandstone reservoirs. Perenco is the largest foreign oil producer operating in Trinidad and Tobago.

Turkey
In January 1996, Perenco took over oil fields in the vicinity of Diyarbakir, South East Turkey.

Perenco operates some 200 wells and seven production gathering stations within a 100 km long zone. Perenco's export facility is located at the Pirinclik terminal, which exports crude oil to Mediterranean seaports. .

United Kingdom

Perenco operates five compression hubs/gas gathering platforms with their connecting pipelines to the Bacton Gas Terminal on the Norfolk coast.
East Leman (Block 49/27)
Inde - (Block 49/23)
Trent - (Block 44/24)
Lancelot - (Block 48/17)
Thames (Block 49/28)

Perenco in 2011 acquired the onshore Wytch Farm oilfield from BP, as part of a shared venture, while maintaining full operatorship.

Perenco in 2012 acquired all offshore Southern North Sea BP gas assets, previously called "SGA". The asset transfer included an office in Hessle and the Dimlington gas terminal.

Venezuela 
Perenco holds interests in two public-private partnerships, Petrowarao and Baripetrol. Petrowarao operates Pedernales and Ambrosio. Baripetrol operates Colon.

The Pedernales Field is located on the northern margin of the Orinoco Delta. The surrounding environment is a combination of tidal channels and mangrove, with water depth between 3m and 10m. The installation comprises floating and fixed platforms with 26 active wells.

In February 2014, Perenco and the Venezuelan state oil firm PDVSA entered into talks for a $600 million financing deal to boost production at their Petrowarao joint venture.

Vietnam 
Perenco has participating interests in 3 Vietnamese companies, 23.25% in Block 15-1, 36% in Block 15-2, and 16.33% in the Nam Con Son pipeline. Perenco’s Vietnamese holdings were acquired from ConocoPhillips in 2012 for a reported $1.29 billion. In 2018, both companies filed a suit in Vietnam to attempt to stop the Vietnamese government from taxing the sale, noting that the sale was between two UK-based companies and therefore not subject to capital gains tax.

Criticism

Land invasion scandal in Mexico 
In the year 2020 in Mexico, the oil company Perenco has used the local forces of order to repress the communities of Tabasco and the landowners who refused to accept the contracts it has imposed on the basis of terrorism. The owners of the land reported to Human Rights and the Government of Mexico the abuse they have committed in the area, however the influence of this company has overshadowed their claims.

Perenco Files 
In 2022 Investigate Europe and Disclose published a series of articles about Perenco "including alleged pollution, structures in tax havens and political ties."

References

External links
 
 Perenco Files at Investigate Europe

Oil companies of France
Oil and gas companies of the United Kingdom
Oil pipeline companies
Multinational companies
Companies based in the City of Westminster
Companies based in Paris